The Crucible of Man: Something Wicked Part 2 is the ninth studio album by American heavy metal band Iced Earth. Released in September 2008, it was the first Iced Earth album since 2001's Horror Show to feature singer Matt Barlow. The Crucible of Man is the second concept album based on guitarist-songwriter Jon Schaffer's Something Wicked Saga. It also the third album overall to feature the subject.

Originally titled Revelation Abomination: Something Wicked Part 2, the majority of The Crucible of Man had been written and recorded at the same time as the group's previous album, Framing Armageddon. Crucible had been intended for an early 2008 release; however, Matt Barlow rejoined Iced Earth in late 2007, and work on the album had to be put-off due to Barlow's prior commitments to the band Pyramaze.

The Crucible of Man: Something Wicked Part 2 was released on September 5, 2008 in Germany, Austria and Switzerland, on September 8 in rest of Europe, and on September 9 in North America. The album ended-up being the last Iced Earth studio album to feature bassist Dennis Hayes, as well as vocalist Matt Barlow, who once again left the band in August 2011.

Story 

The album's story picks-up where the previous album, Framing Armageddon: Something Wicked Part 1, left off. In an interview with Jon Schaffer, he detailed the story of Part 2:

Track listing

Personnel

 Iced Earth
Matt Barlow − lead vocals
Jon Schaffer − guitar, bass guitar, keyboards, backing vocals, lead vocals (on track 5). co-producer
Brent Smedley − drums

 Additional musicians
Corinne Bach - backing vocals
Jason Blackerby - backing vocals
Debra Brant - backing vocals
Jeff Brant - backing vocals
Dennis Hayes − bass guitar (on tracks 3, 5, 6, 10 and 12)
Howard Helm - backing vocals
Kathy Helm - backing vocals
Jim Morris - backing vocals, guitar (on track 5)
Tom Morris - backing vocals
Todd Plant - backing vocals
Steve Rogowski - cello (on track 15)
Troy Seele − guitar (tracks 5, 6, 9)

 Additional personnel
Jim Morris - co-producer, engineer, mixer
Nathan Perry – cover and inner sleeve art
Felipe Machado Franco – cover and inner sleeve art, layout
David Newman-Stump - inner sleeve art

References 

Iced Earth albums
2008 albums
Concept albums
SPV/Steamhammer albums